Lenar Ravilevich Fattakhov (born 12 May 2003) is a Russian football player who plays for FC Rubin Kazan. He plays as a right back.

Club career
He made his debut in the Russian Premier League for FC Rubin Kazan on 20 March 2022 in a game against PFC CSKA Moscow.

Career statistics

References

External links
 
 
 

2003 births
Living people
Russian footballers
Association football midfielders
FC Rubin Kazan players
Russian Premier League players
Russian First League players